Willy Aronsen (8 March 1931 – 18 November 2014) was a Norwegian footballer. He played in six matches for the Norway national football team from 1954 to 1955.

References

External links
 

1931 births
2014 deaths
Norwegian footballers
Norway international footballers
Association football goalkeepers
Sportspeople from Drammen